Khudan is a village located in Jhajjar district in the Indian state of Haryana.

Demographics
In 2011 the population was 4793.

Religion
Majority of the residents are Hindu, with Jats being the dominant social group. There is a temple of Swami Nityanand Maharaj and an old Shiva temple.

Prominent residents
The multiple international medal winner wrestler Bajrang Punia hails from Khudan.      

Mandeep Punia is A freelancer journalist from village khudan. He is deeply covered Farmer protest 2021.

References 

Villages in Jhajjar district